Shirag (also Romanized as Shīrag, Shīrīk, Sherk, Shīrak, and Shīrg; also known as Tak-e Borj) is a village in Fasharud Rural District, in the Central District of Birjand County, South Khorasan Province, Iran. At the 2016 census, its population was 79, in 31 families.

References 

Populated places in Birjand County